Lancelot, the Knight of the Cart, is a 12th-century Old French poem by Chrétien de Troyes, although it is believed that Chrétien did not complete the text himself. It is one of the first stories of the Arthurian legend to feature Lancelot as a prominent character. The narrative tells about the abduction of Queen Guinevere, and is the first text to feature the love affair between Lancelot and Guinevere.

Chrétien's writings impacted the Arthurian canon, establishing Lancelot’s subsequent prominence in English literature. He was the first writer to deal with the Arthurian themes of the lineage of Lancelot, his relationship to Guinevere, secret love and infidelity, and the idea of courtly love. The text also deals with the Christian theme of sin.

Plot 

The story centers on Lancelot's rescue of Guinevere after she has been abducted by Meleagant, the malevolent son of King Bademagu, the righteous ruler of the nearby Kingdom of Gorre. It deals with Lancelot's trials rescuing Guinevere, and his struggle to balance his duties as a warrior and as a lover bound by societal conventions.

The book begins with Guinevere being abducted by Meleagant, who has tricked Arthur into allowing him to do so. After Gawain protests Arthur’s decision to let them go, Arthur allows Gawain to pursue them. While Gawain is searching for the pair, he runs into the (then unnamed) Lancelot who, after riding his horse to death, convinces Gawain to lend him a horse in pursuit of the queen. Lancelot then speeds after Guinevere. When Gawain catches up to him, Lancelot has worn out his new horse to death just as he did his previous one. Lancelot encounters a cart-driving dwarf, who says he will tell Lancelot where Guinevere and her captor went if Lancelot agrees to ride in his cart. Lancelot boards the cart reluctantly as this is a dishonorable form of transport for a knight. Gawain, unwilling to demean himself in this manner, chooses to follow on horseback. Along this journey they encounter many obstacles. Lancelot is regularly derided by locals along his journey for having reduced himself to such a lowly stature by riding in the aforementioned cart. His first trial comes when a maiden offers a bed for the knights, but refuses to let Lancelot lie on it. It is then revealed to be a trap to kill the knights, but it does not faze Lancelot, as after escaping the trap, he returns to sleep in the very bed in which the trap was set. 

After many more encounters with beautiful women and rude knights, Lancelot and Gawain decide to part ways so that they may cover more ground. Lancelot endures many trials, including battling three axe-bearing men, lifting a heavy slab of stone from a mysterious tomb, battling a foreign army from Logres, settling a dispute among those loyal to him over who may host him for the night, fighting against an overly prideful knight, and crossing an extremely sharp "sword-bridge". Lancelot finds Guinevere in the castle of Gorre, and rescues her from Meleagant. However, he is subsequently driven away by her coldness, which is later revealed to be caused by his initial hesitation to enter the cart. Lancelot leaves to find Gawain but is drawn back through his misadventures, and Guinevere apologizes for turning him away. Lancelot breaks into her tower and they spend a passionate night together. He injures his hand during his break-in, and blood from this injury stains Guinevere's sheets. Lancelot sneaks out of the tower before sunrise, and Meleagant accuses Guinevere of committing adultery with Kay, who is the only wounded knight known of nearby. Lancelot challenges Meleagant to a fight to defend Guinevere’s honor. After Meleagant’s father interferes, Meleagant and Lancelot agree to fight in a year's time. During this year, Lancelot is tricked by another dwarf and forced into imprisonment while Guinevere is allowed to return home. When it comes time to duel, Lancelot bargains with his captors to let him go and fight, and he promises to return. When Lancelot fights in the tournament, Guinevere asks him to lose in order to prove his love. He obliges, but when he begins to intentionally throw the battle, Guinevere changes her mind, now instructing him to win instead. Lancelot complies and beats the other tournament competitors, returning to his captors following the battle. Meleagant finds out from the captor's husband that the captor's wife was the one who agreed to release Lancelot temporarily (to fight at the tournament). Meleagant orders Lancelot to be locked away in a master craftsman's castle and Lancelot is imprisoned.

In a continuation, we learn that the woman whom Lancelot had much earlier saved from kidnapping (she ordered Lancelot to sever her stalker's head) was actually Meleagant's sister. She searches for Lancelot in order to return his favor. She finds an axe, and the rope used by Lancelot to pull up food, and sends up the axe instead. Lancelot chops his way out and escapes with her to a secluded home that she owns. Meanwhile, Gawain prepares to battle Meleagant, since Lancelot is missing (a one-year rematch after the second duel was established). Lancelot arrives on time and, at last, fights Meleagant, who loses his temper and his arm (to Lancelot's sword), and is subsequently beheaded by Lancelot. Guinevere tepidly embraces Lancelot (they are in public) in the end.

Development and influence 

It is unknown exactly when the poem was composed, only that it would have been between 1175 and 1181 (most likely 1177), and before or at the same time as Chrétien de Troyes' own Yvain, the Knight of the Lion, (Le Chevalier de Lion), the two serving as companion pieces with overlapping narratives. While little is known definitively about the life of Chrétien, many speculative theories exist based on his work. He was employed as a writer by aristocrats of Champagne, explaining the champenois dialect detected in his work, and he usually crafted stories based on material that was presented to him.

The Knight of the Cart is believed to have been a story assigned to him by Marie de Champagne, and completed not by Chrétien himself, but by the clerk known as Godefroi de Leigni. A 12th-century French writer usually functioned as a part of a team, or a workshop attached to the court. It is believed that in the production of The Knight of the Cart, Chrétien was provided with source material (or matiere), as well as a san, or a derivation of the material. The matiere in this case would refer to the story of Lancelot, and the san would be his affair with Guinevere. Marie de Champagne was well known for her interest in affairs of courtly love, and is believed to have suggested the inclusion of this theme into the story. For this reason, it is said that Chrétien could not finish the story himself because he did not support the adulterous themes.

Chrétien cites Marie de Champagne in his introduction for providing his source material, although no such texts exist today. No recorded mention of an Arthurian knight named Lancelot precedes Chrétien, but he is believed to be derived from a Celtic myth. Chrétien first mentions a character named "Lanceloz del Lac" in Erec and Enide, who he lists third among Arthur's knights after Gawain and Erec. He next mentions him in Cligès where he is defeated by Cligès in a joust. An abduction of the queen is one of the oldest motifs in Arthurian legend, appearing also in Caradoc of Llancarfan's Life of Gildas, and carved on the archivolt in Modena Cathedral.  After Chrétien's version became popular, it was incorporated into the Lancelot-Grail Cycle and eventually into Thomas Malory's influential Le Morte d'Arthur.

Courtly love was coined by the medievalist Gaston Paris in 1883 to help understand the relationship between Lancelot and Guinevere in Lancelot, The Knight of the Cart. Alexander J. Denomy describes courtly love as, "… a type of sensual love and what distinguishes it from other forms of sexual love, from mere passion… is its purpose or motive, its formal object, namely, the lover's progress and growth in natural goodness, merit, and worth." In the Knight of the Cart, Lancelot has become entranced by Guinevere and in more ways than one, is ruled by her. As the queen, Guinevere maintains power over the kingdom as well as Lancelot. When Meleagant questions their love and her adultery to the king, Lancelot challenges Meleagant to a battle to protect Guinevere’s honor. Lancelot has no shame in showing his affair with the queen: "Lancelot’s love explodes into romance without any beginning revealed or end foretold, fully formed and symbolized by the extraordinary fullness of his heart." This introduction of the love affair between Guinevere and Lancelot appears in many other stories after this poem was written.

Notes

References
Chrétien de Troyes; Owen, D. D. R. (translator) (1988). Arthurian Romances. New York: Everyman's Library. .
Colman, Rebecca V. "Reason and Unreason in Early Medieval Law." Journal of Interdisciplinary History 4 (Spring, 1974): 571–591.
Grant, Edward. "Reason Asserts Itself: The Challenge to Authority in the Early Middle Ages to 1200." God and Reason in the Middle Ages. Cambridge: Cambridge University Press, 2001. 
Lacy, Norris J. (1991). "Chrétien de Troyes". In Norris J. Lacy, The New Arthurian Encyclopedia, pp. 88–91. New York: Garland. .
Roquebert, Michel. Les cathares et le Graal. 
Hopkins, Andrea. The Book of Courtly Love: The Passionate Code of the Troubadours. San Francisco: Harper, 1994. .
Condren, Edward I. "The Paradox of Chrétien's Lancelot." MLN (May, 1970): 434–453
Paris, Gaston. "Lancelot du Lac, II:Conte de la charrette." Romania 12 (1883): 459–534
Burns, E. Jane. "Courtly Love: Who Needs It? Recent Feminist Work in the Medieval French Tradition." Signs 27.1 (2001): 23–57.
Chretien de Troyes. Arthurian Romances. Trans. William W. Kibler and Carleton W. Carroll. New York: Penguin Books, 2004.
Noble, Peter. "The Character of Guinevere in the Arthurian Romances of Chretien de Troyes" The Modern Language Review July 1972: 524–535

External links

{{Gutenberg|no=831|name=Four Arthurian Romances by Chrétien de Troyes'}} (includes Lancelot'')
The Charrette Project 2 at Baylor University
Princeton's Charrette Project
Lancelot, the Knight of the Cart in a freely-distributable PDF document
 JSTOR access to Burns article previously cited
 

1170s books
Arthurian literature in French
Medieval French romances
Works by Chrétien de Troyes
Courtly love
French novels adapted into films
Love stories
Unfinished literature completed by others